The term collective trauma calls attention to the "psychological reactions to a traumatic event that affect[s] an entire society." Collective trauma does not only represent a historical fact or event, but is a collective memory of an awful event that happened to that group of people.

Definition 
American sociologist Kai Erikson was one of the first to document collective trauma in his book Everything in Its Path, which documented the aftermath of a catastrophic flood in 1972.

Gilad Hirschberger of Interdisciplinary Center, Herzliya, Israel, defines the term:

According to Thomas Hübl , an author and teacher who leads trainings that have brought international groups together to unpack the dynamics of shared collective traumas : For the past 18 years, Hübl has helped hundreds of thousands of people spark dialogue and work toward repairing some of humanity's worst transgressions. 

Since 2019, he has given talks and led workshops at Harvard Medical School, including this talk in December 2019 on healing collective trauma. 

Clarifying the term collective, Ursula König (2018) focused on two different levels of collective trauma:

Identity group level: Traumatisation can occur amongst various identity groups i.e. age, class, caste, religious and/or ethnic groups. Both size and group coherence may differ and different identity markers may overlap (intersectionality), influencing inter and intra-group dynamics.
Society-level: At the societal level, societies may be affected by traumatisation within a nation state or at a sub/transnational level, influencing the fabric of society as well as the interactions within and between societies.

According to these two distinctions, a collective trauma can only be defined as such if affects can be clearly defined at either level. For example, the traumatisation of many individuals may not be considered collective, unless their traumatic experiences are used as key identity markers in public discourses and/or as a way of self-expression/-definition. Once trauma of many individuals is framed and used as a collective identity marker we can speak of it as such.

Furthermore, a distinction can be made between collective identity markers which in practice are all highly interwoven:

Collective narratives
Collective emotions
Collective mental models/norms and values.

Global impacts 
Traumatic events witnessed by an entire society can stir up collective sentiment, often resulting in a shift in that society's culture and mass actions.

Well known collective traumas include: the Holocaust, the Armenian genocide, slavery in the United States, the Nanjing Massacre, the atomic bombings of Hiroshima and Nagasaki, the Trail of Tears, the Great Irish Famine, attack on Pearl Harbor, the MS Estonia in Sweden, the September 11, 2001 attacks in the United States, the Halabja chemical attack, the COVID-19 pandemic, and various others.

Collective traumas have been shown to play a key role in group identity formation (see: Law of Common Fate). During World War II, a US submarine, the USS Puffer (SS-268), came under several hours of depth charge attack by a Japanese surface vessel until the ship became convinced the submarine had somehow escaped. Psychological studies later showed that crewmen transferred to the submarine after the event were never accepted as part of the team. Later, US naval policy was changed so that after events of such psychological trauma, the crew would be dispersed to new assignments.

Rehabilitation of survivors becomes extremely difficult when an entire nation has experienced such severe traumas as war, genocide, torture, massacre, etc. Treatment is hardly effective when everybody is traumatized. Trauma remains chronic and would reproduce itself as long as social causes are not addressed and perpetrators continue to enjoy impunity. The whole society may suffer from an everlasting culture of pain. However, ways to heal collective trauma have recently been created (see section on Healing Collective Trauma below).

During the Algerian War, Frantz Omar Fanon found his practice of treatment of native Algerians ineffective due to the continuation of the horror of a colonial war. He emphasized about the social origin of traumas, joined the liberation movement and urged oppressed people to purge themselves of their degrading traumas through their collective liberation struggle. He made the following remarks in his letter of resignation, as the Head of the Psychiatry Department at the Blida-Joinville Hospital in Algeria: Inculcation of horror and anxiety, through widespread torture, massacre, genocide and similar coercive measures has happened frequently in human history. There are plenty of examples in our modern history. Tyrants have always used their technique of "psychological artillery" in an attempt to cause havoc and confusion in the minds of people and hypnotize them with intimidation and cynicism. The result is a collective trauma that will pass through generations. There is no magic formula of rehabilitation. Collective trauma can be alleviated through cohesive and collective efforts such as recognition, remembrance, solidarity, communal therapy and massive cooperation.

Multiple international scientific studies have shown how the emotional states of a mother has a direct impact on the developing nervous system of their child and the ensuing development of their brain systems over time.

A study conducted in the aftermath of the Six day war in Israel in 1967 for example, found that women who were pregnant during the wars occurrence were statistically more likely to have had children with schizophrenia. What happened at the collective level of the country, was directly reflected in the individual neurobiological systems of the infants in the womb. Due to the direct correlation/connection between the nervous system and every other organ in our bodies, collective trauma is also evident at the cellular level. Trauma can thus not be understood in purely individual terms.

Collective trauma does not merely reflect a historical fact or the recollection of a traumatic event that happened to a group of people. Collective trauma suggests that the tragedy is represented in the collective memory of the group, and like all forms of memory it comprises not only a reproduction of the events, but also an ongoing reconstruction of the trauma in an attempt to make sense of it. Collective memory of a trauma is different from individual memory because collective memory persists beyond the lives of the direct survivors of the events, and is remembered by group members that may be far removed from the traumatic events in time and space.

Links to mental health 

Reliving traumatic experiences as a collective can lead to a vast range on mental health problems, including Post Traumatic Stress Disorder (PTSD), depression, and disassociation. With collective traumas including events like natural disasters and even historical traumas like The Holocaust, the psychological impact of these vary based on direct and indirect experience. These traumas can result in psychological conditions to prevail, for example we see how PTSD and Alexithymia was developed by survivors of the earthquakes in L'Aquila, Italy. PTSD symptoms can include re-experiencing your traumatic event, avoidance, and emotional numbing such as alexithymia, and many more emotional and physical symptoms . These symptoms and the condition of PTSD are not limited to the victims themselves, but generations after traumatic events as well, usually up to two generations, which can be attributed to a combination of epigenetics and collective cultural trauma (see these sections below). The mental health conditions due to collective trauma are not limited to PTSD, with studies showing higher levels of low self esteem in the children of holocaust survivors  and higher levels of anxiety and depression in those who have experienced a collective historical trauma, like the Native Americans. Therefore, experiencing a collective trauma directly or indirectly can result in many mental health conditions for the collective.

Neurological effects 

When collective trauma is experienced, there are neurological and neurophysiological impacts on the victims and those affected. With most collective trauma accompanied by PTSD, there are two responses that victims are most likely to adopt: reexperiencing and/or hyperarousal and dissociation. These play a part in dictating what neural pathways the brain will form. PTSD and collective trauma have an impact on limbic function, and impact parts of the brain, like the right amygdala, hippocampus, parahippocampal, and temporopolar areas, where survivors of collective trauma experience a lower intensity, which has impact on mood in a negative way. As studies from the L'Aquila earthquake survivors show, the lower intensity of limbic regions in the survivors represents a defensive approach when tasked with emotional involvement, suggesting coping strategies in the form of distancing and disassociation, and a dysfunctional emotional regulating system.

Epigenetics 

Epigenetics is the influence your environment and behaviours have on how your genes work, and with more studies exploring how the epigenome is changed: collective trauma can also be considered. The epigenome is shaped by both genetic variation and environmental experiences, and we see how survivors of collective trauma can alter their epigenome. Exposure to trauma and stressors can alter gene regulation and expression leading to altered patterns of biology and health. Studies show that both mental and physical health outcomes suffer due to epigenetic reasons because of collective trauma. Studies show that through intrauterine signalling, the experience of negative maternal mood or stress during pregnancy can manifest in alterations in epigenetic patterns of offspring, with potential long-term effects on health outcomes, which can continue for generations to come  Further links of parental care and breastfeeding composition also indicate to changes in genetic makeup in offspring, for example if the mother experiences higher levels of the stress hormone cortisol, this will be experienced also by the offspring either in utero or through breastfeeding.

Collective cultural trauma 

Cultural trauma is a form of collective trauma that is seen on a societal and macro-level. With collective trauma being experienced communally- psychological, and mental health consequences of cultural trauma can be explored from individual and community-level perspectives, factoring in family dynamics and geopolitical factors that can amplify the trauma experienced. The Holocaust provides an example of how survivors and their children experienced impaired functioning and poor adjustment to their environments. Studies around refugees and immigrants also indicate how cultural trauma as a collective has vast negative mental health affects and how that is transmitted throughout communities and then generations through epigenetic transmission, but also through parental care that is dictated by family dynamics set by communities. An example of this can be witnessed through Sri Lanka, where a war and tsunami caused collective trauma to be experienced. On multiple levels, Sri Lankans who were affected by the war and tsunami saw changed in the dynamics of family relations, a lack of trust between community members and child rearing changed as well. These changed the cultural norms in Sri Lankan society, and created a negative environment where communities tended to be more dependent, passive, silent, without leadership, mistrustful, and suspicious. As a collectivist culture, this shared trauma changed the dynamic of communities in a significant way, and changed the cultural identities of many Sri Lankans. This highlights how collective trauma has an impact on cultural identity on a large scale

Influence of technology on collective trauma 

Technology provides many opportunities and potential for creative connection and collaboration, such as for example through commons based peer production, see for example commons-based peer production - Wikipedia itself is an example for this.

However, there is also ways in which technology and its use nowadays creates a large amount of collective trauma enhancing content. The fast pace of information flow can overwhelm the human cognition- and nervous system. Author Thomas Hübl explains that humans can create, develop and evolve only if their nervous system integrates and digests well the data and information to be transformed. However, the current speed and complexity of data spread and consumed through technological infrastructure can create an enormous pressure onto the human nervous system. If a nervous system is overwhelmed, it is unable to integrate information, and it creates increased levels of anxiety, hyperactivity, stress, disembodiment and hence disconnection from the self. These are symptoms of trauma.

For example, the high speed level of violence-charged global news sent around through socio-technological infrastructures can cause a nervous system to be overwhelmed. Hence, the inability of receiving (historical or current) collective trauma content at a fast pace recreates collective trauma.

Healing collective trauma 
The above-mentioned author and international group facilitator Thomas Hübl worked out and finalized a facilitated group process to address, integrate and heal collective trauma. In 2016, he co-founded the international non-profit, the Pocket Project, to train facilitators - and offer direct support - to integrate and heal collective trauma in regions throughout the world. Hübl bases this work on recent scientific insights, working with what he refers to as the Collective Trauma Integration Process (CTIP). The aim of this process goes wider than merely addressing the well-being of individuals with collective trauma: the process is based on the premise that healing collective trauma, collectives (communities, societies, nations) can more effectively transform and prevent further systemic disruptions which are rooted in originating traumas (wars, various forms of oppression, etc.). This process requires a refined reflection process, usually done in groups, to safely explore historic ancestral and transgenerational trauma.

The application of CTIP has shown that when given the right space, hence when a coherent and safe space is created by the facilitator and the group, trauma emerges and can be digested and integrated together in a supportive and skilled facilitation environment. Thomas Hübl himself has led many of these processes and has this way helped healing collective traumata especially related to World War II and The Holocaust, and worked with groups from more than 40 countries. Furthermore, he highlights the importance of mediation practice and presence for the integration process:

In the Stanford Social Innovation Review, authors Ijeoma Njaka & Duncan Peacock examine trauma in the context of social change, arguing that trauma inhibits and limits our sustained attention to the complex crises we currently face. They write:

Global social witnessing 
"Global Social Witnessing" is a term that was elaborated by Thomas Hübl and William Ury in 2017 as a practice of "contemplative social cognition". Following their understanding of collective trauma as being at the roots of most conflicts – although generally in an unrecognised and unconscious way –, they defined Global Social Witnessing as a process of insight in which one has the ability to gain a precise and comprehensive picture of what is happening, which – they say – is required to make adequate peace-building and healing possible.

An article in Tricycle magazine covered the 2017-18 Pocket Project training on collective trauma, including an explanation of global social witnessing:Thomas Hübl explains the related concept of conscious experience as the ability of a person or a system to have awareness of one's own current life process. Regarding this, Global Social Witnessing deals with the collective subject's awareness of its own process. 
On the individual level, it is the ability of compassion that enables a human to depict the inner life of another being in him. This feeling of compassion is the pre-requisite for truly healing and the potential for promoting action. It also applies on a collective level when one acquires an understanding of the processes happening in society within his/her self. This is one's transformation into an adult and integrated citizen of a community (nation, culture, etc.). Relating appropriately to the events and processes of the culture is what enables one to come to an appropriate, creative action or response. 
In this sense, witnessing a traumatic event is also about getting out of a disconnected-unrelated position that is simply pointing out the most obvious culprits, and instead actually acquiring a larger understanding of it as phenomenon of society. Global Social Witnessing can therefore be a point of breakage to the vicious circle of indifference and inadequate responses that follow collective traumatic events, and which, unhealed, continually cause more trauma.

See also
 Historical trauma
 Post Traumatic Slave Syndrome
 Transgenerational trauma
 National trauma

References

Group processes
Trauma types
Adverse childhood experiences